The Alaskan Athabascans, Alaskan Athabascans, Alaskan Athapascans or Dena are Alaska Native peoples of the Athabaskan-speaking ethnolinguistic group. They are the original inhabitants of the interior of Alaska.

In Alaska, where they are the oldest, there are eleven groups identified by the languages they speak. These are the Dena’ina or Tanaina (Ht’ana), Ahtna or Copper River Athabascan (Hwt’aene), Deg Hit’an or Ingalik (Hitʼan), Holikachuk (Hitʼan), Koyukon (Hut’aane), Upper Kuskokwim or Kolchan (Hwt’ana), Tanana or Lower Tanana (Kokht’ana), Tanacross or Tanana Crossing (Koxt’een), Upper Tanana (Kohtʼiin), Gwich'in or Kutchin (Gwich’in), and Hän (Hwëch’in). The Alaskan Athabascan culture is an inland creek and river fishing (also coastal fishing by only Dena'ina of Cook Inlet) and hunter-gatherer culture. The Alaskan Athabascans have a matrilineal system in which children belong to the mother's clan, with the exception of the Yupikized Athabaskans (Holikachuk and Deg Hit'an).

Formerly they identified as a people by the word Tinneh (nowadays Dena; cf. Dene for Canadian Athabaskans). Taken from their own language, it means simply "men" or "people".

Life and culture

The Athabascan people hold potlatches which have religious, social and economic significance. 

Dogs were their only domesticated animal, but were and are an integral element in their culture for the Athabascan population in North America.

Notable Alaskan Athabascans

George Attla (1933–2015) was a champion sprint dog musher.
Emil Notti, an American engineer, indigenous activist and democratic politician. Key in the development of the Alaska Native Claims Settlement Act.
Quinn Christopherson is an American singer-songwriter. He won the 2019 Tiny Desk Contest with his entry "Erase Me," a song describing his experience with male privilege and erasure as a transgender man.
John Sackett (1944–2021) served in the Alaska House of Representatives from 1967 to 1971 and in the Alaska Senate from 1973 to 1987.
Michael J. Stickman, First Chief of the Nuwato Tribal Council.
Siobhan Wescott, physician and public health advocate; she has served as Director of the American Indian Health Program and is a Professor of American Indian Health at the University of Nebraska.

See also
 Tanana Athabascans
 The potlatch among Athabaskan peoples
 Tanana Chiefs Conference (all Alaskan Athabaskans' [excl. Ahtna and Dena'ina] a territorial-level organization)
 Doyon, Limited
 Alaska Native Language Center
 Alaska Federation of Natives
 Shamanism among Alaska Natives
 Poldine Carlo
 Kathleen Carlo-Kendall
 Peter Kalifornsky
 Mary TallMountain
 Indian ice cream (Alaska)
 Athabascan fiddle
 Emil Notti
Effie Kokrine (Project Jukebox, UAF)

References